Zoe Byrd Akins (October 30, 1886 – October 29, 1958) was an American playwright, poet, and author. She won the 1935 Pulitzer Prize for drama for The Old Maid.

Early life

Zoe Byrd Akins was born in Humansville, Missouri, second of three children of Thomas Jasper and Sarah Elizabeth Green Akins. Her family was heavily involved with the Missouri Republican Party, and for several years her father served as the state party chairman. Through her mother, Akins was related George Washington and Duff Green. Her family moved to St. Louis, Missouri when Akins was in her early teens. She was sent to Monticello Seminary in Godfrey, Illinois for her education and later Hosmer Hall preparatory school in St. Louis. While at Hosmer Hall she was a classmate of poet Sara Teasdale, both graduating with the class of 1903. It was at Monticello Seminary that Akins wrote her first play, a parody of a Greek tragedy. Following graduation Akins began writing a series of plays, poetry and criticism for various magazines and newspapers as well as occasional acting roles in St. Louis area theatre productions.

Career and life

Her first major dramatic work was Papa, written in 1914. The comedy failed even though it greatly impressed both H.L. Mencken and George Jean Nathan, 
During this time several of her early plays were adapted for the screen. These adaptations were mostly failures, released as silent films in a time when the industry was transitioning to sound. While some "talkie" stars had notable roles in the films (Walter Pidgeon and a young Clark Gable), most of the films are now believed to be lost. In 1930, Akins had another great success with her play, The Greeks Had a Word For It, a comedy about three models in search of rich husbands 

In the early 1930s, Akins became more active in film, writing several screenplays as well as continuing to sell the rights to plays such as The Greeks Had a Word for It (1930), which was adapted for the movies three times, in 1932 (as The Greeks Had a Word for Them), 1938 (as Three Blind Mice), and 1953 (How to Marry a Millionaire). Two highlights of this period were the films Sarah and Son (1930) and Morning Glory (1933), the latter remade as Stage Struck. Both films earned their respective female leads (Ruth Chatterton and Katharine Hepburn) Academy Award nominations for Best Actress (Hepburn won).

Akins did not pursue a screenwriting career beyond her early successes. In 1932, she married Hugo Rumbold (in the last year of his life) and, after several Hollywood films, she returned to writing plays and spending time with her family. She was rumored to be in a long-term relationship with Jobyna Howland until Howland's death in 1936. According to Anita Loos, the two squabbled often, "But such gibes actually held the key to their devotion." She was the great-aunt of actress Laurie Metcalf. She lived for a short time in Morrisonville, Illinois.

In 1935, she was awarded the Pulitzer Prize for Drama for her dramatization of Edith Wharton's The Old Maid, a melodrama set in New York City and written in five episodes stretching across time from 1839 to 1854. The play was adapted for a 1939 film starring Bette Davis.

In 1936, Akins co-wrote the screenplay for Camille, adapted from Alexandre Dumas's play and novel, La dame aux camélias  The film starred Greta Garbo, Robert Taylor, and Lionel Barrymore, and earned Garbo her third Oscar nomination.

Later life and legacy

Akins died in her sleep on the eve of her 72nd birthday, in 1958, in Los Angeles. She is buried in San Gabriel District Cemetery.

Akins archives is held in the collection of the Bancroft Library at the University of California, Berkeley.

Selected filmography
 Déclassée (1925)
 Her Private Life (1929)
 Sarah and Son (1930)
 Anybody's Woman (1930)
 The Right to Love (1930)
 Working Girls (1931)
 The Greeks Had a Word for Them (1932)
 Christopher Strong (1933)
 Outcast Lady (1934)
 Accused (1936)
 Lady of Secrets (1936)
 Camille (1936)
 The Old Maid (1939)
 Zaza (1939)

References

External links

 
 
 
 
 Index Entry for Zoe Akins at Poets' Corner

1886 births
1958 deaths
People from Humansville, Missouri
American women screenwriters
Bisexual screenwriters
Bisexual novelists
Bisexual poets
Bisexual dramatists and playwrights
American LGBT poets
American LGBT novelists
American LGBT screenwriters
American LGBT dramatists and playwrights
Pulitzer Prize for Drama winners
Bisexual women
American women dramatists and playwrights
20th-century American dramatists and playwrights
20th-century American women writers
Screenwriters from Missouri
20th-century American screenwriters
American bisexual writers